Saang mein is a type of Chinese noodle found in Hong Kong. It is often available in overseas Chinatowns.

Production

It is made of wheat flour, tapioca flour, salt, potassium carbonate, and water.

Variety

Saang mein can be cooked quickly similarly to ramen noodles. It is known for a more smooth and soapy texture. It can be eaten plain or with additional sesame oil. Vegetables such as kai-lan can be added. The noodle does have a wheat taste. It is served hot.

See also

 Thin noodle

References

Hong Kong cuisine
Chinese noodles